Vathylakkos ("deep ditch") may refer to several places in Greece:

Vathylakkos, Drama, a village in the municipality of Drama
Vathylakkos, Karditsa, a village in the Menelaida municipal unit
Vathylakkos, Kozani, a village in the Kozani regional unit
Vathylakkos, Thessaloniki, a town in the municipality of Chalkidona, Thessaloniki regional unit